Beta Trianguli Australis, Latinized from β Trianguli Australis, is a double star in the southern constellation of Triangulum Australe. This star has a relatively high rate of proper motion across the celestial sphere. It is a F-type main-sequence star with a stellar classification of F1 V. Beta TrA has a 14th magnitude optical companion at an angular separation of 155 arcseconds.

Observation with the Spitzer Space Telescope reveals what appears to be an excess infrared emission from this star. This suggests the presence of circumstellar material in this system, making it a debris disk candidate. This star may be a member of the Beta Pictoris moving group, an association of about 17 stars that share a common origin and a similar motion through space. If it is a member of this group, this would put the age of β TrA at about 12 million years; the same as the group itself.

Modern legacy
β TrA appears on the  flag of Brazil, symbolising the state of Santa Catarina.

References

F-type main-sequence stars
Circumstellar disks
Double stars
Beta Pictoris moving group

Triangulum Australe
Trianguli Australis, Beta
Durchmusterung objects
0601
141891
077952
5897